Hillside is a census-designated place (CDP) in Ulster County, New York, United States. The population was 860 at the 2020 census. It is located just south of the city of Kingston, and the Town of Ulster.

Geography
Hillside is located at  (41.9181, -74.0351).

Demographics

At the 2000 census there were 882 people, 336 households, and 276 families in the CDP. The population density was 1,048.8 per square mile (405.4/km). There were 344 housing units at an average density of 409.1/sq mi (158.1/km).  The racial makeup of the CDP was 95.24% White, 1.36% African American, 2.49% Asian, 0.23% from other races, and 0.68% from two or more races. Hispanic or Latino of any race were 1.81%.

Of the 336 households 32.4% had children under the age of 18 living with them, 74.7% were married couples living together, 4.5% had a female householder with no husband present, and 17.6% were non-families. 16.1% of households were one person and 10.7% had someone living alone who was 65 years of age or older. The average household size was 2.63 and the average family size was 2.90.

The age distribution was 25.3% under the age of 18, 3.6% from 18 to 24, 20.4% from 25 to 44, 31.2% from 45 to 64, and 19.5% who were 65 years of age or older. The median age was 45 years. For every 100 females there were 103.7 males. For every 100 females age 18 and over, there were 97.9 males.

The median household income was $80,095 and the median family income  was $88,061. Males had a median income of $67,361 versus $50,536 for females. The per capita income for the CDP was $38,809. None of the families and 0.5% of the population were living below the poverty line, including no under eighteens and 3.0% of those over 64.

References

External links
 Hillside, New York is at coordinates .

Census-designated places in New York (state)
Census-designated places in Ulster County, New York